Huang or Hwang may refer to:

Location 
 Huang County, former county in Shandong, China, current Longkou City
 Yellow River, or Huang River, in China
 Huangshan, mountain range in Anhui, China
 Huang (state), state in ancient China.
 Hwang River, in Gyeongsangnam-do, South Korea

People 
 Emperor of China, titled as Huángdì (皇帝)
 Huang (surname) (黄 / 黃), Chinese surname with several Vietnamese variants
 Hwang (surname) (黃), (皇), a common Korean family name

Other uses 
 Huang (jade), a jade arc-shaped artifact that was used as a pendant
 Fenghuang, mythological birds of East Asia
 Huang, a character in the anime cartoon Darker than Black
 Hwang Seong-gyeong, a character in the Soulcalibur video game series
 Huang (Coca-Cola), a brand of Coca-Cola
 Huang Harmonicas, a Chinese-based manufacturer of harmonicas, founded by noted harmonicist Cham-ber Huang
 The 201st radical (⿈/⻩) of the Kangxi Dictionary